Polyspatha is a genus of perennial monocotyledonous flowering plants in the family Commelinaceae. It is restricted to tropical Africa consists of three recognized species.

The genus is characterised by its unique leaf-like bracts that subtend inflorescences (often called spathes), which are arranged oppositely up the flowering shoot. Plants in the genus also have white flowers, two carpels with one seed in each, and vegetative reproduction by stolons. Along with most other genera of the Commelineae tribe with relatively few species, Polyspatha is found in tropical forest understories, and also in disturbed shady locations.

 Species
 Polyspatha paniculata Benth.  - western + central Africa from Sierra Leone to Zaire + Tanzania
 Polyspatha oligospatha Faden - western + central Africa from Ivory Coast to Zaire + Sudan
 Polyspatha hirsuta Mildbr. - western + central Africa from Sierra Leone to Zaire + Uganda

References

Commelinaceae
Commelinales genera
Flora of Africa